Nobody Knows may refer to:

Film and television

Film
 Nobody Knows (1920 film), a German silent drama film
 Nobody Knows (1970 film), a South Korean film
 Nobody Knows (2004 film), a Japanese film

Television
 Nobody Knows (TV series), a South Korean TV series
 "Nobody Knows" (Pac-Man and the Ghostly Adventures), a television episode

Books
 Nobody Knows, a 2002 novel by Mary Jane Clark

Music
 Nobodyknows, a Japanese pop group
 Nobody Knows., a 2013 album by Willis Earl Beal, or the title song
 Nobody Knows: The Best of Paul Brady, a 1999 compilation album, or the 1991 title song (see below)
 Nobody Knows: The Best of the Tony Rich Project, a 2005 compilation album by Tony Rich, or the 1995 title song (see below)

Songs
 "Nobody Knows" (Celeste Buckingham song), 2011
 "Nobody Knows" (Darin song), 2012
 "Nobody Knows" (Nik Kershaw song), 1986
 "Nobody Knows" (Pink song), 2006
 "Nobody Knows" (Tony Rich song), 1995; covered by Kevin Sharp, 1996
 "Nobody Knows", by Billy Squier from Don't Say No, 1981
 "Nobody Knows", by the Brothers Four, 1961
 "Nobody Knows", by Brute Force, 1969
 "Nobody Knows", by Destroy All Monsters, 1979
 "Nobody Knows", by the Dillards, 1965
 "Nobody Knows", by the Faces from First Step, 1970
 "Nobody Knows", by Junior English, 1969
 "Nobody Knows", by Live from V, 2001
 "Nobody Knows", by Mahalia Jackson, 1954
 "Nobody Knows", by Mike and the Mechanics from Living Years, 1988
 "Nobody Knows", by Mylène Farmer from Avant que l'ombre..., 2005
 "Nobody Knows", by Paul Brady from Trick or Treat, 1991
 "Nobody Knows", by Paul McCartney from McCartney II, 1980
 "Nobody Knows", by the Rumour, 1971
 "Nobody Knows", by September from Love CPR, 2011
 "Nobody Knows", by Slightly Stoopid from Chronchitis, 2007
 "Nobody Knows", by Sub Focus, 2016
 "Nobody Knows", by T. L. Barrett, 1971

See also
 No One Knows (disambiguation)